"O du eselhafter Peierl", K. 559a, is a canon composed by Wolfgang Amadeus Mozart. The music, originally in F major, is set for four singers. The words are probably by Mozart himself.

Origin
The work was written sometime between 1785 and 1787. On 2 September 1788, Mozart entered it into his personal catalog of works as part of a set of ten canons. Although some of the canons in the set of ten have serious (that is, religious) lyrics, K. 559a was meant for fun, a gesture of mocking, scatological humor directed at a friend of Mozart's, the baritone  (1761–1800). The canon begins:O, du eselhafter Peierl
O, du peierlhafter Esel
Oh, you asinine Peierl
oh you Peierline ass.
Later, the lyrics include "O leck mich doch geschwind im Arsch" ("Oh lick me real quick in the ass (arse)"), a favorite expression in Mozart's scatological works. For more examples and discussion, see Mozart and scatology.

"O du eselhafter Peierl" was originally intended to be sung immediately following "Difficile lectu". For the tale of how these two canons originated, see "Difficile lectu".

Revised version
Mozart later transposed "O du eselhafter Peierl" into G major, in versions that replaced "Peierl" with the names of two other individuals, named Martin and Jakob. There are other minor differences in words and notes.

According to Link (2007), "Martin" was the composer Vicente Martín y Soler. The lyrics of the revised canon replace "Nepomuk" (see above) with "Lipperl", a German diminutive form of "Philipp".

Autographs
The autograph (original manuscript copy) of K. 559a has survived; it is a "tiny slip of paper" (Searle) on the reverse side of which is the original of K. 559. For discussion, see Difficile lectu. The later G major version, K. 560, is also preserved and is currently in the Mozarteum in Salzburg.

Reception
The canon is perhaps the most often performed of Mozart's comic canons; performances have often used bowdlerized versions of the lyrics.

Zaslaw and Cowdury (1990) express admiration for the work, saying "it makes brilliant use of imitative and hocket-like devices" and "possesses the clockwork-like vocal interplay of a well-wrought opera buffa ensemble."

Lyrics
{|
|+Original F major version, K. 559a.
|O du eselhafter Peierl!
o du peierlhafter Esel!
du bist so faul als wie ein Gaul,
der weder Kopf noch Haxen hat.
Mit dir ist gar nichts anzufangen;
ich seh dich noch am Galgen hangen.
Du dummer Gaul, du bist so faul,
du dummer Peierl bist so faul als wie ein Gaul.
O lieber Freund, ich bitte dich,
o leck mich doch geschwind im Arsch!
Ach, lieber Freund, verzeihe mir,
den Arsch, den Arsch petschier ich dir
Peierl! Nepomuk! Peierl! verzeihe mir!
|
O, you asinine Peierl!
O, you Peierline ass!
You're as idle as a nag 
with neither head nor legs!
There's nothing to be done with you
I'll see you hanged yet.
You stupid nag, you're so idle
You stupid Peierl, you're idle as a nag
Oh dear friend, I beg you
Oh kiss my [ass|arse] real quick!
Oh dear friend, forgive me,
I'm going to whip your [ass|arse].
Nepomuk! Peierl! Forgive me!
|}

{|
|+Revised G major version, K. 560.
|O du eselhafter [Jakob|Martin]!
o du [Jakobischer|Martinischer] Esel!
du bist so faul als wie ein Gaul,
der weder Kopf noch Haxen hat.
Mit dir ist gar nichts anzufangen;
ich seh dich noch am Galgen hangen.
Du dummer Paul, halt du nurs Maul,
Ich scheiß dir aufs Maul, so hoff' ich wirst doch erwachen.
O lieber Lipperl, ich bitte dich recht schön,
o leck mich doch geschwind im Arsch!
O, lieber Freund, verzeihe mir,
den Arsch, den Arsch petschier ich dir.
Lipperl! [Jakob|Martin]! Lipperl! verzeihe mir!
|
O, you asinine [Jakob|Martin]!
O, you [Jakobite|Martinine] ass!
You're as idle as a nag 
with neither head nor legs!
There's nothing to be done with you
I'll see you hanged yet.
You stupid Paul, shut your trap.
I'll shit on your mouth, I hope that wakes you up.
Oh dear Lipperl, I ask you so sweetly
Oh kiss my [ass|arse] real quick!
Oh dear friend, forgive me,
I'm going to whip your ass.
Lipperl! [Jakob|Martin]! Lipperl! Forgive me!
|}

See also

Bona nox
Leck mich im Arsch
Leck mir den Arsch fein recht schön sauber

Notes

Sources
Abert, Hermann (2007) W. A. Mozart. Translated by Stewart Spencer with notes by Cliff Eisen. New Haven: Yale University Press.
Hocquard, Jean-Victor (1999) Mozart ou la voix du comique, Maisonneuve & Larose.
Link, Dorothea (2007) "Vicente Martín y Soler (Martini)", in Cliff Eisen and Simon P. Keefe, eds., The Cambridge Mozart Encyclopedia. Cambridge: Cambridge University Press.
Quinn, Michael (2007) "Canon", in Cliff Eisen and Simon P. Keefe, eds., The Cambridge Mozart Encyclopedia. Cambridge: Cambridge University Press.
Weber, Gottfried (1824) "Originalhandschrift von Mozart" (An original manuscript of Mozart), Caecilia 1:179–182
Zaslaw, Neal and William Cowdery (1990) The Compleat Mozart: A Guide to the Musical Works of Wolfgang Amadeus Mozart. Norton.

External links
. The preface, in German, discusses the origin of the canon.

, Chorus Viennensis
 K. 560

Canons by Wolfgang Amadeus Mozart
1788 compositions
Off-color humor
Compositions in F major